The 1987–88 UTEP Miners men's basketball team represented the University of Texas at El Paso in the 1987–88 college basketball season. The team was led by head coach Don Haskins. The Miners finished 23–10 (10–6 in WAC) and reached the NCAA tournament.

Roster

Schedule and results

|-
!colspan=9 style=| Non-conference Regular season

|-
!colspan=9 style=| WAC Regular season

|-
!colspan=9 style=| WAC tournament

|-
!colspan=9 style=| NCAA tournament

Rankings

References

UTEP Miners men's basketball seasons
Utep
Utep